Somnath Soni (born 20 June 1998) is an Indian cricketer. He made his Twenty20 debut for Arunachal Pradesh in the 2018–19 Syed Mushtaq Ali Trophy on 2 March 2019.

References

External links
 

1998 births
Living people
Indian cricketers
Arunachal Pradesh cricketers
Place of birth missing (living people)